NYC 22 (pronounced NYC 2-2) is an American police procedural drama television series that aired on CBS from April 15 to August 11, 2012, as a mid-season replacement for CSI: Miami. On May 13, 2012, CBS canceled the series after one season.

Premise
The series follows a diverse group of rookie New York City Police Department (NYPD) officers as they patrol the streets of Upper Manhattan.

Cast and characters
 Adam Goldberg as Officer Ray "Lazarus" Harper, a divorced Jewish former newspaper reporter, who has a fifteen-year-old daughter, Ruby Harper.
 Leelee Sobieski as Officer Jennifer "White House" Perry, a Marine MP veteran of the Iraq War
 Stark Sands as Officer Kenny McLaren, the son of an NYPD deputy inspector and a fourth generation police officer
 Judy Marte as Officer Tonya Sanchez, whose family has a long history on the wrong side of the law
 Harold House Moore as Officer Jayson "Jackpot" Toney, a former player in the NBA
 Felix Solis as Sgt. Terry Howard, a detective with the 22nd Precinct's Anti-Crime squad
 Tom Reed as Officer Ahmad Khan, an Afghan immigrant
 Terry Kinney as Sgt. Daniel "Yoda" Dean, the rookies' training officer and a 25-year veteran of the force

Development and production
The series first appeared on the development slate at CBS in late 2010, under the name Rookies, after a report that CBS had purchased the series from creators Robert De Niro and Richard Price. In January 2011, the network placed a pilot order.

Casting announcements began in mid-February, with Leelee Sobieski being cast as Jennifer Perry, one of the rookies. Next to board the project were Judy Marte, Tom Reed, and Stark Sands, who all portray rookie cops. Adam Goldberg joined the cast a week later as a former reporter turned rookie cop. Terry Kinney signed on in mid-March as the field training officer for the rookies.

CBS green-lighted production of the series in May 2011 under the new title The 2-2, but the name was changed again when the network announced that the series would premiere on April 15, 2012, as NYC 22. NYC 22 took over the timeslot of CSI: Miami, which had its season shortened slightly to make room for the new drama. The series returned on July 7, 2012, to burn off the remaining episodes.

Critical reception
The show was met with mixed reviews, and holds a Metacritic score of 57 out of 100.

Episodes
According to cast member Stark Sands, NYC 22 episodes were not originally aired in the order they were shot, which led to confusing character arcs. The production order according to him is listed below in the second column.

Ratings
According to TV by the Numbers, following the first episode, "The series premiere of NYC 22 drew just a 1.5 adults 18–49 rating at 10pm. That compares with a 2.1 rating average for new episodes of CSI: Miami since January, and a 1.7 for the significantly delayed finale last week."  The same site's "Renew-Cancel Index", which analyzes the odds of shows being renewed or canceled by comparing them to the 18–49 ratings for all the scripted shows on the same network, scored the show with a 0.51 index rating (51% of CBS's scripted average) and categorized the show as "certain to be canceled".  Four weeks later, on May 13, 2012, the series was canceled.

DVD release

International broadcasts

References

External links

2010s American crime drama television series
2010s American police procedural television series
2012 American television series debuts
2012 American television series endings
CBS original programming
English-language television shows
Television series created by Richard Price (writer)
Fictional portrayals of the New York City Police Department
Television series by CBS Studios
Television shows set in New York City
Television shows filmed in New York City